The Stagg Inn is a restaurant located in Titley, Herefordshire, England. As of 2015, the restaurant holds one star in the Michelin Guide.  The Stagg was the first pub to be awarded a Michelin star in 2001.

The Stagg Inn also offers accommodation, in the pub and at the Old Vicarage, just down the road.

References

External links
 The Stagg Inn website
 The Guardian review 2001
 The Telegraph review 2013

Restaurants in Herefordshire
Michelin Guide starred restaurants in the United Kingdom